Choerilus of Samos was an epic poet of Samos, who flourished at the end of the 5th century BC.

Biography
 
After the defeat of Athens in the Peloponnesian War, Choerilus settled at the court of Archelaus, king of Macedon, where he was the associate of Agathon, Melanippides, and Plato the comic poet. The only work that can with certainty be attributed to him is the Περσηίς (Perseis) or Περσικά (Persika), a history of the struggle of the Greeks against Persia, the central point of which was the Battle of Salamis. His importance consists in his having taken for his theme national and contemporary events in place of the deeds of old-time heroes. For this new departure he apologizes in the introductory verses, where he says that the subjects of epic poetry being all exhausted, it was necessary to strike out a new path. The story of his intimacy with Herodotus is probably because he imitated him and had recourse to his history for the incidents of his poem.

The Perseis was at first highly successful and was said to have been read, together with the Homeric poems, at the Panathenaea, but later critics reversed this favorable judgment. Aristotle, calls Choerilus' comparisons far-fetched and obscure, and the Alexandrians displaced him by Antimachus in the canon of epic poets. The fragments are artificial in tone.

References

Sources
 In this article, he is the second poet named Choerilus discussed. This article cites:

 Another view of his relations with Herodotus.

Ancient Greek epic poets
5th-century BC poets
Ancient Samians
Courtiers of Archelaus I of Macedon
Battle of Salamis
Metics in Classical Athens